New York City's 48th City Council district is one of 51 districts in the New York City Council. It has been represented by Republican Inna Vernikov since December 2021.

Geography
District 48 covers a series of neighborhoods – many of them with large Orthodox Jewish populations – in southern Brooklyn, including Brighton Beach, Homecrest, Manhattan Beach, parts of Midwood and Sheepshead Bay, and a small section of Coney Island.

The district overlaps with Brooklyn Community Boards 13, 14, and 15, and with New York's 8th, 9th, and 11th congressional districts. It also overlaps with the 17th, 19th, 22nd, and 23rd districts of the New York State Senate, and with the 41st, 42nd, 45th, 46th, and 48th districts of the New York State Assembly.

Recent election results

2021
In 2019, voters in New York City approved Ballot Question 1, which implemented ranked-choice voting in all local elections. Under the new system, voters have the option to rank up to five candidates for every local office. Voters whose first-choice candidates fare poorly will have their votes redistributed to other candidates in their ranking until one candidate surpasses the 50 percent threshold. If one candidate surpasses 50 percent in first-choice votes, then ranked-choice tabulations will not occur.

2017

2013

References

New York City Council districts